Buraydah may refer to:
Buraydah or Buraidah, a city in Saudi Arabia
Buraydah, a Sahaba
Abu Buraydah, a Sahaba
Buraydah ibn al-Khasib, one of the Sahaba, one of the Muhammad's companions, and one of the leading persons of the Banu Asiam